Murexsul nothokieneri is a species of sea snail, a marine gastropod mollusk in the family Muricidae, the murex snails or rock snails.

Description

Distribution
This marine species occurs off East London, Cape Province, South Africa.

References

 Vokes E.H. (1978). Muricidae (Mollusca: Gastropoda) from the eastern coast of Africa. Annals of the Natal Museum. 23(2): 375–418, pls 1–8.
 Houart, R.; Kilburn, R. N. & Marais, A. P. (2010). Muricidae. pp. 176–270, in: Marais A.P. & Seccombe A.D. (eds), Identification guide to the seashells of South Africa. Volume 1. Groenkloof: Centre for Molluscan Studies. 376 pp.

Muricidae
Gastropods described in 1978